Dryophthorinae is a weevil subfamily within the family Curculionidae. While it is not universally accepted as distinct from other curculionid subfamilies, at least one major recent revision elevated it to family rank, as Dryophthoridae

Tribes
 Cryptodermatini (monotypic)
 Cryptoderma
 Dryophthorini

Tribe group "Orthognathinae"
 Orthognathini
 Rhinostomini (monotypic)
 Rhinostomus (includes Yuccaborus)

Tribe group "Rhynchophorinae"
 Diocalandrini (monotypic)
 Diocalandra
 Litosomini
 includes Sitophilus Schönherr, 1838
 Ommatolampini
 Aphiocephalus
 Cylindrodcyba
 Lampommatus
 Ommatolampes
 Polytini (monotypic)
 Polytus
 Rhynchophorini
 Sphenophorini

Tribe group "Stromboscerinae"
 Stromboscerini

Tribe uncertain 
 Barystethus

References

External links 
 ITIS Standard Report Page: Dryophthorinae
 BugGuide Subfamily Dryophthorinae